Head massage or scalp massage is a form of massage directed towards the scalp or head of the recipient.

Head massage devices
One such massage device is the "Orgasmatron", made of partially flexible copper wires attached to a handle and operated manually. It is made by an Australian company of the same name.  The device is sold in the United States under the name "Happy's Head Trip". The Orgasmatron was designed by Dwayne Lacey, who registered the design in 1998. Since it was first brought to market, several similar devices appeared, resulting in legal action from Lacey. According to The Guardian, the device induces "a heavenly, tingling sensation".

The head massager is used so that the rods encompass the skull of the person massaged, the movements maneuvering it can be either circular or back and forth.

Indian head massage
Indian head massage is an alternative medicine massage. One form of this is Champissage (a trademark; possibly a portmanteau of chāmpi, the Hindi and Urdu term for the practice, and massage). In Champissage, the upper back, shoulders, neck, head and face are massaged.

Indian head massage was brought to the West by Narendra Mehta in the 1970s.  He went on to establish the London Centre of Indian Champissage, based in North London. After his death, his wife Kundan Mehta and their godson Moses Chundi took over the running of the Centre, which now trains students across the globe.

See also
 Massage chair

References

External links
Orgamsatron official website

Massage therapy
Manual therapy
Massage devices
Human head and neck